Hybolasius lineiceps is a species of beetle in the family Cerambycidae. It was described by Broun.

References

Hybolasius